Filip Ristanic (born 30 January 2004) is an Austrian footballer who plays for Admira Wacker as a forward.

Club career 
Ristanic began playing football for SV Wienerberg. In July 2017 he joined Admira Wacker. On 28 August 2020 he made his Austrian Cup debut for Admira Wacker team against WSC Hertha. On 24 July 2021 he made his Bundesliga debut against WSG Tirol.

International career 
Ristanic has played internationally for Austria at under-15, under-16 and under-17 levels.

References

2004 births
Living people
Austrian footballers
FC Admira Wacker Mödling players
Austrian Football Bundesliga players
Austrian Regionalliga players
Association football forwards
Austrian people of Bosnia and Herzegovina descent
Austria youth international footballers